Joseph Franklin Poland (September 4, 1892 – March 23, 1962) was an American screenwriter. He wrote for more than 130 films between 1913 and 1954. He was born in Waterbury, Connecticut and died in Los Angeles, California.

Selected filmography

 Drawing the Line (1915)
 Patsy (1917)
 The Beautiful Adventure (1917)
 A Daughter of Maryland (1917)
 Wild Primrose (1918)
 Set Free (1918)
 The Spitfire of Seville (1919)
 Yvonne from Paris (1919)
 A Bachelor's Wife (1919)
 The Intrusion of Isabel (1919)
 The Triflers (1920)
 A Thousand to One (1920)
 Blind Hearts (1921)
 Princess Jones (1921)
 The Cup of Life (1921)
 Elope If You Must (1922)
 Madness of Youth (1923)
 Good-By Girls! (1923)
 Man's Size (1923)
 The Night Hawk (1924)
 The Half-Way Girl (1925)
 The Unguarded Hour (1925)
 Hold That Lion (1926)
 The Sophomore (1929)
 Overland with Kit Carson (1930)
 The Lawless Nineties (1936)
 Mysterious Doctor Satan (1940)
 Jungle Girl (1941)
 King of the Texas Rangers (1941)
 Dick Tracy vs. Crime, Inc. (1941)
 Spy Smasher (1942)
 Perils of Nyoka (1942)
 King of the Mounties (1942)
 G-Men vs the Black Dragon (1943)
 Daredevils of the West (1943)
 Secret Service in Darkest Africa (1943)
 Captain America (1944)
 The Tiger Woman (1944)
 Haunted Harbor (1944)
 Zorro's Black Whip (1944)
 Manhunt of Mystery Island (1945)
 Federal Operator 99 (1945)
 The Purple Monster Strikes (1945)
 Stage to Mesa City (1947)
 Black Hills (1947)
 Superman (1948)
 Bruce Gentry (1949)
 Batman and Robin (1949)
 Atom Man vs. Superman (1950)
 Captain Video: Master of the Stratosphere (1951)
 Fargo (1952)

External links
 

1892 births
1962 deaths
American male screenwriters
Writers from Waterbury, Connecticut
Screenwriters from Connecticut
20th-century American male writers
20th-century American screenwriters